Dave Muntzel (born September 30, 1950) is an American politician. He is a former Republican member of the Missouri House of Representatives, having served from 2013-2019. After serving in the Missouri House for four terms, Muntzel was unable to file for reelection due to Missouri's statutory term limits.

References

Living people
Missouri Republicans
1950 births
21st-century American politicians